Martin Blank may refer to:

 Martin Blank (artist) (born 1962), American glass artist
 Martin Blank (politician) (1897–1972), German politician
 Martin Blank (playwright), American playwright, screenwriter, and theatrical producer
 Martin Blank (Grosse Pointe Blank), lead character in the film Grosse Pointe Blank
 Martin Blank (Marvel Comics), the alter ego of the Marvel Comics character known as Gibbon.